XESFT-AM/XHSFT-FM (branded as La Poderosa) was a radio station in San Fernando, Tamaulipas.

History
XESFT-AM received its concession on November 7, 1988 and signed on two days later. It was owned by Arnoldo Rodríguez Zermeño. In 1997, Zermeño sold the station to Radiodifusora XESFT, S.A. de C.V., which in turn sold it to its current concessionaire, controlled by Raúl Garza Acosta and Raúl Gregorio Garza Salazar, in 2000.

It was authorized to move to FM in 2011. The station's concession expired without renewal on November 6, 2015, and XHSFT signed off in June 2019, leaving the entire municipality of San Fernando without FM radio service and prompting the municipality to buy advertising on a pirate Christian radio station.

External links

References

Radio stations in Tamaulipas
Defunct radio stations in Mexico
1988 establishments in Mexico
2019 disestablishments in Mexico
Radio stations established in 1988
Radio stations disestablished in 2019